Kollu Ravindra is an Indian politician from Andhra Pradesh who served as MLA for Machilipatnam (Assembly constituency) from 2014 until his defeat in 2019. He has also held cabinet ministerial position during his tenure as an MLA.

Early life 
Kollu Ravindra was born in Machilipatnam , Krishna District . He entered into politics in 1998 & became TDP youth president of machilipatnam .

Political life 

Kollu Ravindra entered politics in 1998 as Youth President of the Telugu Desam Party in Machilipatnam, a position he held for ten years. He was then given the TDP ticket in Machilipatnam for the May 2009 Andhra Pradesh Assembly elections. He lost that election by 9,300 votes to the Congress candidate Perni Venkataramaiah. Five years later in 2014, he defeated the same Perni Venkataramaiah by 15,800 votes. He then entered the Andhra Pradesh Cabinet with two portfolios: Handlooms & Excise and BC Welfare and Empowerment. Following a cabinet reshuffle in April 2017, he was appointed Minister for Law & Justice, Skill Development, Youth, Sports, Unemployment Benefits, NRI Empowerment and Relations.

In March 2015, Kollu Ravindra started Sparsha, a charity dedicated to the education of poor people in Machilipatnam.

Personal life 

Kollu Ravindra is married and having two sons. His father-in-law is former Andhra Pradesh Cabinet Minister Nadakuditi Narasimha Rao.

As Minister 
In February 2019 kollu ravindra launched Youth for Andhra mobile app.

In July 2018 kollu ravindra inaugurated APNRT Migrant Resource building in guntur district.

In June 2018 kollu ravindra inaugurated Cargo services in Gannavaram international airport.

In May 2018 kollu ravindra inaugurated naipunya at Mangalagiri.

In February 2017 Kollu Ravindra inaugurated National Handloom Exhibition in Guntur.

Kollu Ravindra also done some of the developmental activities in his constituency.

References 

|-

Telugu politicians
Telugu Desam Party politicians
Andhra Pradesh MLAs 2014–2019
State cabinet ministers of Andhra Pradesh
Living people
Year of birth missing (living people)